Tatsiana Mikhailava also known as Tatyana Mikhailova (born 18 January 1987) is a Belarusian speed skater. She competed in the women's mass start event during the 2018 Winter Olympics.

She was influenced to take the sport of speed skating by her husband, Vitaly Mikhailov who is also a fellow Belarusian speed skater and a national record holder. Coincidentally, both Tatsiana Mikhailava and Vitaly Mikhailov made their Olympic debuts at the 2018 Winter Olympics.

References 

1987 births
Living people
Belarusian female speed skaters
Speed skaters at the 2018 Winter Olympics
Olympic speed skaters of Belarus